María Victoria Ledesma Cuevas (30 May 1932 – 1 August 2022), known by her stage name Rosa de Castilla, was a Mexican singer and actress. She is noted as one of the great folkloric leading ladies of the "golden age" of Mexican cinema. In the musical field, she has toured the world singing in countries such as Israel.

Career

Acting

De Castilla made her film debut in Julián Soler's Los tres alegres compadres (1952), starring Jorge Negrete, Pedro Armendáriz, and Andrés Soler.

As the second female lead after Flor Silvestre, she co-starred in a western trilogy: El lobo solitario, La justicia del lobo, and Vuelve el lobo (all in 1952).

In 1954, she was nominated for an Ariel Award for Best Actress in a Minor Role for Rogelio A. González's Tal para cual (1953). She starred as the female lead in two films in Eastmancolor: Ismael Rodríguez's Mexican Revolution drama Tierra de hombres (1956), her first color film, and Jaime Salvador's musical comedy ¡Aquí están los aguilares! (1957). Other notable films she appeared in during the late 1950s are the Mexiscope productions of Yo... el aventurero (1959) and Tan bueno el giro como el colorado (1959). She played the ranchera singer wife of Demetrio González in Dos corazones y un cielo (1959).

In the 1960s, she starred in mostly westerns or comedies such as Héroe a la fuerza (1964), co-starring Eulalio González and Sara García.

By the early 1970s, her career had waned, though she made some comebacks in the late 1990s.

Singing
De Castilla sang ranchera songs in most of her films. In 1956, Capitol Records released her album The Sounds of Old Mexico, which also featured Antonio Aguilar, Luis Pérez Meza, and Rosita Quintana. In 1967, she signed with RCA Víctor; her records were "beginning to sell" in Australia that same year.

Filmography

Film

 Los tres alegres compadres (1952)
 El lobo solitario (1952)
 La justicia del lobo (1952)
 Vuelve el lobo (1952)
 Hot Rumba (1952)
 Made for Each Other (1953)
 The Unknown Mariachi (1953)
 Sandunga para tres (1954)
 Contigo a la distancia (1954)
 Las nenas del 7 (1955)
 Tierra de hombres (1956)
 Here Are the Aguilares! (1957)
 La virtud desnuda (1957)
 Desnúdate, Lucrecia (1958)
 Tres desgraciados con suerte (1958)
 El jinete solitario en el valle de los buitres (1958)
 Milagros de San Martín de Porres (1959)
 Yo... el aventurero (1959) as Gloria Cisneros
 Tan bueno el giro como el colorado (1959)
 Cada quién su música (1959)
 Dos corazones y un cielo (1959) as Isabel del Río
 Dos gallos en palenque (1960)
 Me importa poco (1960)
 Bala de Plata en el pueblo maldito (1960)
 The Hell of Frankenstein (1960) as Estela
 Northern Courier (1960)
 The Mask of Death (1961)
 ¡Mis abuelitas... no más! (1961)
 La comezón del amor (1961)
 Ay Chabela...! (1961)
 La justicia de los Villalobos (1961)
 Pueblo de odios (1962)
 Aquí están los Villalobos (1962)
 Los forajidos (1962)
 Horizontes de sangre (1962)
 Ahí vienen los Argumedo (1962)
 Vuelven los Argumedo (1963)
 Héroe a la fuerza (1964) as Lucha
 Diablos en el cielo (1965)
 Aquella Rosita Alvírez (1965)
 El tigre de Guanajuato: Leyenda de venganza (1965)
 Pistoleros del oeste (1965)
 El jinete justiciero en retando a la muerte (1966)
 Los amores de Juan Charrasqueado (1968)
 Cuatro hombres marcados (1968)
 El asesino enmascarado (1970)
 El pueblo del terror (1970) (uncredited)
 Campeones del ring (1972)
 Las nenas de quinto patio (1995)
 Reclusorio III (1999)
 La paloma de Marsella (1999)

Television
 Los hijos de nadie (1996) as Amparo Valencia

References

External links

 

1932 births
2022 deaths
Mexican film actresses
Mexican television actresses
Mexican stage actresses
Golden Age of Mexican cinema
Ranchera singers
Actresses from Jalisco
Singers from Jalisco
20th-century Mexican actresses
20th-century Mexican women singers
Musart Records artists
Women in Latin music